The Michigan Warriors were a Tier II Junior A ice hockey team based in Flint, Michigan. The Warriors played in the North American Hockey League's North Division. Previously known as the Marquette Rangers, the Warriors played their home games at Perani Arena and Event Center.

In 2010 and Perani Arena decided to sign a lease agreement with the junior Michigan Warriors instead of the minor professional Flint Generals, leaving only junior hockey in a town that hosted several minor professional teams. Had the Generals returned for 2010–11, the Warriors would have still remained making sure their home schedule had no conflicts with the Generals. In 2015, the Michigan Warriors suspended operations due of the arrival of the Flint Firebirds of the Ontario Hockey League.

Franchise history

The Warriors were previously known as the Marquette Rangers playing out of the 3,100-seat Lakeview Arena in Marquette, Michigan. Their inaugural season was 2006–07, in which they were able to make the playoffs but fell to the Mahoning Valley Phantoms in the first round. The Rangers missed the playoffs for the next two seasons before returning in the 2009–10 season. Once more the Rangers fell in the first round, this time swept out in three games by the Motor City Machine. In their first season in Flint, the Warriors turned a third place regular season finish into a playoff run that took them to the league championship game. In a battle for their respective first league titles, the Warriors dropped a 4–2 game to the Fairbanks Ice Dogs.

Prior to the end of the 2014–15 season the Ontario Hockey League (OHL) announced the relocation of the Plymouth Whalers to Flint to become the Flint Firebirds. Knowing Flint could not support two junior teams at the same time, the Warriors looked for relocation alternatives.

Season records

Playoffs
2007
First Round – Mahoning Valley Phantoms defeated Marquette Rangers 3-games-to-0
2010
First Round – Motor City Machine defeated Marquette Rangers 3-games-to-0
2011
Divisional Semi-Finals – Michigan Warriors defeated Traverse City North Stars 3-games-to-1
Divisional Finals – Michigan Warriors defeated Bismarck Bobcats 2-games-to-0
Robertson Cup Round-Robin –  Michigan Warriors 1 win, 2 loss – qualified for semi-finals (Bulls 2–5, Ice Dogs 2–4, RoadRunners 5–2)
Robertson Cup Semi-Finals – Michigan Warriors defeated Amarillo Bulls 6–2 score
Robertson Cup Finals – Fairbanks Ice Dogs defeated Michigan Warriors 4–2 score
2012
Divisional Semi-Finals – Port Huron Fighting Falcons defeated Michigan Warriors 3-games-to-1
2014
Divisional Semi-Finals – Michigan Warriors defeated Janesville Jets 3-games-to-0
Divisional Finals – Michigan Warriors defeated Port Huron Fighting Falcons 3-games-to-1
Robertson Cup Semi-Finals – Fairbanks Ice Dogs defeated Michigan Warriors 2-games-to-0
2015
First Round – Janesville Jets defeated Michigan Warriors 3-games-to-0

External links
Official site

North American Hockey League teams
North American Hockey League
Amateur ice hockey teams in Michigan
Ice hockey teams in Flint, Michigan
2006 establishments in Michigan
2015 disestablishments in Michigan
Ice hockey clubs established in 2006
Ice hockey clubs disestablished in 2015